The Summit Fire was a wildfire that started in the Mias Canyon area north of Banning in Riverside County, California, on May 1, 2013. By the time the fire was contained on May 4,  had burned and 1 residence had been destroyed.

References

2013 California wildfires
Wildfires in Riverside County, California